Hikkaduwa Urban Council (HUC) is the local authority for the town of Hikkaduwa in the Galle District, Southern Province, Sri Lanka. The HUC is responsible for providing a variety of local public services including roads, sanitation, drains, housing, libraries, public parks and recreational facilities. It has 11 councillors elected using an open list proportional representation system.

Election results

2011 local government election
Results of the local government election held on 17 March 2011:

References

Government of Galle District
Local authorities in Southern Province, Sri Lanka
Urban councils of Sri Lanka